Incirrata (or Incirrina) is a suborder of the order Octopoda.  The suborder contains the classic "benthic octopuses," as well as many pelagic octopus families, including the paper nautiluses.  The incirrate octopuses are distinguished from the cirrate octopuses by the absence in the former of the "cirri" filaments (found with the suckers) for which the cirrates are named, as well as by the lack of paired swimming fins on the head, and lack of a small internal shell (the "shell" of Argonauta species is not a true shell, but a thin calcite egg case).

Classification
CLASS CEPHALOPODA
Subclass Nautiloidea: nautilus
Subclass †Ammonoidea: ammonites
Subclass Coleoidea
Superorder Decapodiformes: squid, cuttlefish
Superorder Octopodiformes
Family †Trachyteuthididae (incertae sedis)
Order Vampyromorphida: vampire squid
Order Octopoda
Genus †Keuppia (incertae sedis)
Genus †Palaeoctopus (incertae sedis)
Genus †Paleocirroteuthis (incertae sedis)
Genus †Proteroctopus (incertae sedis)
Genus †Styletoctopus (incertae sedis)
Suborder Cirrina: finned deep-sea octopus
Suborder Incirrata
Superfamily Octopodoidea
Family Amphitretidae
subfamily Amphitretinae
subfamily Bolitaeninae
subfamily Vitreledonellinae
Family Bathypolypodidae
Family Eledonidae
Family Enteroctopodidae
Family Megaleledonidae
Family Octopodidae
Superfamily Argonautoidea
Family Alloposidae: seven-arm octopus
Family Argonautidae: argonauts
Family Ocythoidae: tuberculate pelagic octopus
Family Tremoctopodidae: blanket octopus
Note: A new unnamed white species was discovered February 26, 2016 by NOAA’s Deep Discoverer about 2.5 miles below the ocean surface near the Hawaiian Archipelago.

References

Octopuses